Donald Bailey, also known as Don Bailey, is an Australian architect, and executive director of the RAIA in Canberra after his own private practice. In 1960 Donald Bailey setup Howlett and Bailey Architects with Jeffrey Howlett in Perth, Western Australia. Other than having won the competition for Perth Town hall, they went on and built up a reputation by winning a couple of successful practice in Perth including Perth concert hall. Their firm were also involved in other projects such as the already demolished Manager's House, the Public Suite, the Beatty Park Pool kiosk.

Personal life

It was during the days of working with Stephenson and Turner which Donald met his wife Janet. As for Janet, she was often seen playing the role of hostess to many RAIA committees and meetings. Initially Donald had been working with Stephenson and Turner in Melbourne. He was then given an opportunity for an overseas stint to work in England and Canada and travelling in Europe and North America for five years. He only returned to Australia in mid–fifties.
Putting a couple of his notable projects aside, Donald Bailey is also the chief executive of the national secretariat of RAIA consisting of four divisional directors and a staff of eleven, including the practice division based in Melbourne. His tasks includes assisting the President in representing the Institute at the highest levels of government and in the national consultative bodies of the professions and the building industry and also the advising of RAIA Executive on policy matters in order to keep in touch with the broad spectrum of Institute activities at top level. It is widely known that different presidents have found Donald Bailey's reign within the Institute invaluable. During those days one of Donald Bailey's antics is he is known to 'secretly' appear in disguises in Melbourne University meetings from time to time, with the purpose towards his vision to draw closer ties between the national body and chapters.

Notable projects 
 Perth Town Hall (1960)
 Perth Council House (1961–1963)
 Reserve Bank Of Australia (Canberra branch)
 Perth Concert Hall (1971–1973)

Awards and competitions 
 New Perth City Council administration buildings competition (1960)
 Competition for a town hall and auditorium for Perth (1961)

External links 
 http://www.architecturemedia.com/aa/aaissue.php?article=16&issueid=200603&typeon=3
 https://web.archive.org/web/20110630202851/http://www.australiaforeveryone.com.au/icons_per_councilhse.htm
 https://web.archive.org/web/20121125225844/http://www.perthconcerthall.com.au/default.aspx?MenuID=63
 http://www.facebook.com/pages/Howlett-and-Bailey-Architects/138504986179188
 https://web.archive.org/web/20090531103205/http://register.heritage.wa.gov.au/PDF_Files/C%20-%20A-D/02097%20Council%20House%20%28I-AD%29.PDF

Architects from Melbourne
Living people
Recipients of the Royal Australian Institute of Architects’ Gold Medal
Year of birth missing (living people)